The East Boston gas surge was a series of fires and at least one explosion that took place early on the morning of September 23, 1983.  An underground control that regulated the flow of natural gas failed, causing a surge of the fuel into the neighborhood of East Boston, Massachusetts.

The sudden swell of gas rushed into businesses and residences, increasing the size of pilot lights to as much as a foot high. A number of fires started as a result and the second floor of one building in the Central Square area exploded.

Between 3:15 am and 8:00 am, 9-1-1 operators received approximately 170 calls reporting fires and the smell of gas. People rushed into the streets, and McClellan Highway and the Callahan Tunnel were closed to incoming traffic with the exception of emergency vehicles.

By mid-morning, the fires had been extinguished and the gas problem was fixed. The Boston Gas Company later said that a broken water main had flooded a gas regulator, causing the surge. There were no reports of injuries or deaths.

See also
Merrimack Valley gas explosions

References

Explosions in 1983
1983 in Boston
East Boston
Gas explosions in the United States
1983 disasters in the United States